Yona Melnik (born 27 May 1949) is an Israeli former judoka and current coach. He is the first Israeli judoka to achieve 8th dan from the International Judo Federation.

Biography
Melnik is Jewish, and was born in Kassel, West Germany. He won the Israeli national championship in judo 12 times between 1968 and 1980 in the welterweight (below 70 kilograms) category, and twice in the open division. He won gold medals in judo at the 1969 Maccabiah Games and at the 1973 Maccabiah Games. He competed for Israel at the 1976 Summer Olympics in Montréal, Québec, in the half-middleweight category, and tied for 19th place.

Melnik subsequently coached the Israeli judo team, and opened a dojo in Petah Tikvah. He co-authored an April 2006 article in Strength & Conditioning Journal titled "The Ten-Station Judo Ability Test: A Test of Physical and Skill Components."

References

External links
 
 
 

Living people
Sportspeople from Kassel
Jewish Israeli sportspeople
Olympic judoka of Israel
Maccabiah Games gold medalists for Israel
1949 births
Israeli male judoka
Judoka at the 1976 Summer Olympics
Competitors at the 1969 Maccabiah Games
Competitors at the 1973 Maccabiah Games
German emigrants to Israel
Maccabiah Games medalists in judo